The Lawyers' Row Historic District encompasses a group of four commercial office buildings on West 2nd Street in Malvern, Arkansas.  The four buildings, joined by party walls, are all single-story masonry structures, built between 1910 and 1920, with awnings across the front, and a raised parapet with decorative panels above the awning.  These buildings were all built to house law offices, giving the area its name.  Most of the lawyers had moved out by 2000.

The district was listed on the National Register of Historic Places in 2015.  At that time, there were still two legal offices in the district's buildings.

See also
National Register of Historic Places listings in Hot Spring County, Arkansas

References

Buildings and structures in Malvern, Arkansas
Historic districts on the National Register of Historic Places in Arkansas
National Register of Historic Places in Hot Spring County, Arkansas
Law offices
Legal history of Arkansas